Akersgata (1-73E, 2-74) is a street in Oslo, Norway. It contains a number of important buildings such as the Parliament of Norway Building, several government buildings in the Regjeringskvartalet, the Trefoldighetskirken (Trinity Church), and the Centralteatret.

References

Streets in Oslo